The Modbury Football Club (nicknamed the Hawks) is an Australian rules football club based in Modbury, a suburb of Adelaide in South Australia.

Formed in 1862, the Modbury Football Club is the oldest extant football club in South Australia and the sixth oldest football club of any code in Australia.

The Modbury Hawks currently field 30 teams. Senior teams compete in the South Australian Amateur Football League and junior teams in the North Eastern Metropolitan Junior Football League. It also now fields a women's team and an under-18 girls' team in the SAWFL. The club has over 550 registered players.

History 

The first game recorded as taking place was between Modbury and the Adelaide Football Club in 1862.  Each side had 20 players but there were no umpires.  The game ended after Adelaide kicked its second goal and the game was declared in their favour, 2 goals to nil.

The two teams met again the following year, on a strip of land near the Modbury Hotel (Civic Park), when "the game was kept up with the greatest spirit and good feeling, and so equally were the sides matched that not a goal was obtained"

To celebrate the 100th anniversary, in 1962, and during the state's 150th-year celebrations, in 1986, a special game was played between the Modbury Football Club and the South Adelaide Football Club at Modbury Oval to commemorate two of the oldest clubs in the state.

The club celebrated its 150th year in 2012.

Club honours
Modbury Premierships (35 senior, 44 junior)

A grade: (18)
1934, 1935, 1963, 1967, 1968, 1974, 1976, 1978, 1985, 1989, 1992, 1994, 2001, 2004, 2005, 2008, 2014, 2016

B grade: (4)
1972, 1992, 2001, 2004

C grade: (9)
1988, 1989, 1994, 1997, 1998, 2005, 2009, 2013, 2017

D grade: (3)
1994, 2015, 2017

Under 18: (1)
2019

Under 16: (2)
1979, 2012, 2019

Under 15: (6)
1970, 1994, 1995, 2010, 2013, 2015

Under 14: (4)
1992, 1993, 1994, 1999

Under 13: (12)
1970, 1971, 1991, 1992, 1993, 1994, 1997, 1998, 1999, 2012, 2015, 2017

Under 12: (7)
1982, 1987, 1990, 1993, 1999, 2005, 2010

Under 11: (10)
1969, 1989, 1991, 1993, 1993 (composite), 1995, 1998, 2010, 2011, 2012

Under 10: (2)
1982, 1985

Guernseys
 Up to 1937 – Maroon guernsey with one white band, later replaced with a white vee
 1947–1978 – Dark blue guernsey with a light blue vee
 1979–onwards – Brown and gold vertical stripes

Grounds
up to 1963 – Old Modbury Oval (Civic Park, adjacent to the Modbury Hotel).
1964 – Memorial Oval, Tea Tree Gully.
1965 – Temporary Oval, now Waterworld Swimming Centre.
1966 – onwards – Modbury Oval

Illyarrie Oval was also used for junior training and games.

Leagues
Prior to 1906 – Records not kept 
1906 – Hills Football Association 
1932 – North Eastern Hills Football Association  
1933 – Hills Football Association 
1934 – North Eastern Hills Football Association 
1936 – East Torrens Football Association 
1947 – North Adelaide District Football Association 
1969 – Norwood-North Football Association 
1978 – South Australian Football Association 
1988 – South Australian Amateur Football League

Club song

We're a happy team at Modbury,
We're the Mighty Fighting Hawks.
 
We love our club and we play to win,
Riding the bumps with a grin, at Modbury.
 
Come what may you'll find us striving,
Team work is the thing that talks.
 
One for all and all for one,
Is the way we play at Modbury.
 
We are the Mighty Fighting Hawks.

References

External links
 

Australian rules football clubs in South Australia
Adelaide Footy League clubs
Australian rules football clubs established in 1862
1862 establishments in Australia